The 2005–06 season saw Wrexham compete in Football League Two where they finished in 13th position with 59 points.

Final league table

* Deducted 1 point for fielding an ineligible player

Results
Wrexham's score comes first

Legend

Football League Two

FA Cup

Football League Cup

Football League Trophy

Squad statistics

References

External links
 Wrexham 2005–06 at Soccerbase.com (select relevant season from dropdown list)

Wrexham A.F.C. seasons
Wrexham